Onconotus servillei is a species of insect in family Tettigoniidae. It is found in Hungary and Romania.

References

Tettigoniidae
Taxonomy articles created by Polbot
Insects described in 1846